Jose Madrigal Ochoa (born August 4, 1974), better known as Dominic Ochoa, is a Filipino actor, comedian, model and  member of ABS-CBN's circle of homegrown talents named Star Magic, as part of the batch 4. He is currently managed by  Boy Abunda.

Career
Dominic's first TV appearance was a special guest participation in T.G.I.S. on GMA Network in 1996, then the same year, Dominic transferred to ABS-CBN for his youth-oriented drama program, Gimik and also his first comedy show with the late Redford White in Super Laff In. He stayed with ABS-CBN where he is one of the network's actors for 26 years from 1996 to 2022.

Dominic has many teleseryes dramas and also a funny sitcom on ABS-CBN and Kapamilya Channel, including his 1st sitcom with the late young matinee idol Rico Yan, actor and chef maker Marvin Agustin, comedian singer dancer Vhong Navarro (replaces the late Rico Yan) in Whattamen formerly aired in 2001 until 2002.  His last project on ABS-CBN was Darna in 2022.  Dominic moved back to GMA Network for his comeback teleserye project, Abot-Kamay na Pangarap.

Personal life
He is from the prominent Relova family in Pila, Laguna where his great grandfather Arcadio was formerly Capital Municipal who built the municipio during his term, grand uncle Lorenzo Relova was formerly Associate Justice of the Supreme Court and another great grand uncle Regino Diaz Relova is a lieutenant colonel in the Katipunan who commanded the Laguna towns of Los Banos, Calauan, Bay and Pila during the Philippine–American War. His previous girlfriend was Janna Victoria and is now married to businesswoman Denise Go. He is the cousin of actor Mandy Ochoa.

Filmography

Television

Film

Awards and nominations

Notes

References

External links

1973 births
Living people
Filipino male television actors
Star Magic
People from Parañaque
Male actors from Metro Manila
Filipino male comedians
ABS-CBN personalities
GMA Network personalities
Filipino male film actors